Two ships of the Royal Norwegian Navy have borne the name HNoMS Gyller, after Gyller – one of the twelve horses of the Æsir:

  was a steam-powered schooner launched in 1847.
  a  launched in 1938 and captured by the Germans in 1940. Returned to Norway in 1945 and rebuilt as frigate in 1948.

Royal Norwegian Navy ship names